Alan Ariel Robledo (born 17 February 1998) is an Argentine professional footballer who plays as a centre-back for Alvarado.

Career
Robledo began his senior footballing career with Chacarita Juniors in Primera B Nacional. He first appeared on a teamsheet in November 2016 in a 3–0 defeat against Almagro, four further unused substitute appearances followed in 2016–17 until he made his professional debut on 10 May 2017 in a home loss to Brown; he played the full ninety minutes. At the end of 2016–17, Chacarita were promoted to the Argentine Primera División. His first appearance in the top-flight arrived on 29 October versus Newell's Old Boys.

On 29 June 2021, Robledo joined Alvarado.

Career statistics
.

References

External links

1998 births
Living people
People from General San Martín Partido
Argentine footballers
Association football defenders
Primera Nacional players
Argentine Primera División players
Chacarita Juniors footballers
Club Atlético Alvarado players
Sportspeople from Buenos Aires Province